Jamial St. John Rolle (born 16 April 1980) is a Bahamian sprinter who specializes in the 200 metres.

Individually, he competed at the 2006 Commonwealth Games, but failed to progress past the quarterfinals. With the Bahamian 4 x 100 metres relay team he finished fourth at the 2003 Central American and Caribbean Championships and won a bronze medal at the 2005 Central American and Caribbean Championships.

His personal best times are 20.51 seconds in the 200 metres, and 10.26 seconds in the 100 metres.

Rolle ran for Missouri State University, winning the 2001 Missouri Valley Conference 200 meters indoor championship.

He teamed up with Adrian Griffith, Shavez Hart and Trevorvano Mackey to break the Bahamian 4×100 national record in Morelia, Mexico.

Personal bests

Outdoor
100 m: 10.16 s (wind: +1.4 m/s) –  Clermont, Florida, 7 May 2016
200 m: 20.51 s (wind: +2.0 m/s) –  Montverde, Florida, 8 June 2013
400 m: 47.26 s –  Fort Valley, Georgia, 25 February 2006
Long jump: 7.59 m (wind: NWI) –  Jonesboro, Arkansas, 15 April 2000

International competitions

1: Did not show in the final.

References

1980 births
Living people
Bahamian male sprinters
Athletes (track and field) at the 2002 Commonwealth Games
Athletes (track and field) at the 2003 Pan American Games
Athletes (track and field) at the 2006 Commonwealth Games
Athletes (track and field) at the 2010 Commonwealth Games
Athletes (track and field) at the 2011 Pan American Games
Athletes (track and field) at the 2014 Commonwealth Games
Commonwealth Games competitors for the Bahamas
Athletes (track and field) at the 2016 Summer Olympics
Olympic athletes of the Bahamas
Pan American Games competitors for the Bahamas